Pyrates is a 1991 comedy film.

Pyrates may also refer to:
  The Pyrates, a 1983 comedic novel by George MacDonald Fraser
 Mega Bloks Pyrates, a construction block toy line
 A General History of the Pyrates, a 1724 book about pirates
 Pyrates!, a Folk-rock band